Manuel Muñoz Borrero (1891 – 1976) was an Ecuadorian diplomat who issued approximately 100 Ecuadorian passports to save Jews during the Holocaust. He is the only Ecuadorian to be recognized by Yad Vashem as a Righteous among the Nations.

Biography
Manuel Muñoz Borrero was born in Cuenca, Ecuador, in 1891. In 1931, he began working as a consul in Stockholm, Sweden. After Nazi Germany had invaded most of Europe by 1941, Muñoz Borrero issued around 80 passports to Poles, many of whom were Jewish. As a result of this, the Ecuadorian government relieved him of his duties in January, 1942; however, the diplomatic seals and archives remained in Muñoz Borrero's possession, as the Swedish authorities did not confiscate them as requested by the Ecuadorian government. Despite being terminated, Muñoz Borrero continued to issue passports to Jews in occupied Europe.

Some, though not all, who had received Ecuadorian passports managed to escape the Holocaust. One survivor, who credited her survival in Bergen-Belsen concentration camp due to being issued an Ecuadorian passport and later taking part in a prisoner exchange, wrote "I probably would not have survived if not for the passports issued by Mr. Manuel Muñoz Borrero. I am forever grateful to him." After the war, Muñoz Borrero's work remained relatively unknown, and he died in obscurity in 1976, having never been rehabilitated during his lifetime by the Ecuadorian government for his actions during World War II. Yad Vashem eventually recognized Muñoz Borrero as a Righteous Among the Nations on February 28, 2011, and in 2018, the Ecuadorian government posthumously restored Muñoz Borrero's credentials, apologizing to Muñoz Borrero's family and acknowledging his work of saving Jews.

References

1891 births
1976 deaths
Righteous Among the Nations
Ecuadorian diplomats